Somphou was the king of Lan Xang from 1496 until 1501 AD. Succeeded on the death of his father King La Sen Thai in 1496. Reigned under the regency of his uncle, Prince Laksana Vijaya Kumara, until he came of age and died unexpectedly in 1501.

References

External links

Kings of Lan Xang
Year of birth unknown
1500 deaths
15th-century Laotian people
15th-century monarchs in Asia
Laotian Theravada Buddhists